World Volleyball Championship may refer to
 FIVB Volleyball Men's World Championship
 FIVB Volleyball Women's World Championship